The name Iva was used for seven tropical cyclones in the Eastern Pacific Ocean. The name was retired in the spring of 1989, and replaced with Ileana in the 1994 season.

 Hurricane Iva (1961)
 Tropical Storm Iva (1968)
 Tropical Storm Iva (1972)
 Hurricane Iva (1976)
 Hurricane Iva (1978)
 Tropical Storm Iva (1982)
 Hurricane Iva (1988)

See also
 Tropical Storm Iba (2019) – a similar name which was used in the South Atlantic. 

Pacific hurricane set index articles